Stika or Štika (Czech feminine: Štiková) is a surname. Notable people with the surname include:

 František Štika (born 1960), Czech handball player
 Joseph Stika (1889–1976), United States Coast Guard vice admiral
 Richard Stika (born 1957), American Catholic bishop

See also
 

Czech-language surnames